Killgore Hall, also known as Wroten's Hardware, was a historic commercial building located at Newport, New Castle County, Delaware. It was built in 1883, and was a three-story, three bay by six bay, brick building with a flat roof and overhanging cornice.  It has a one-story, one bay extension. A three-story porch spanned the east facade, with Colonial Revival columns and square balusters. It was located next to the Joseph Killgore House.  The building was demolished about 2000.

It was added to the National Register of Historic Places in 1993.

References

Commercial buildings on the National Register of Historic Places in Delaware
Colonial Revival architecture in Delaware
Commercial buildings completed in 1883
Buildings and structures in New Castle County, Delaware
National Register of Historic Places in New Castle County, Delaware